The Taipei Representative Office in Denmark; represents the interests of Taiwan in the Kingdom of Denmark and Iceland in the absence of formal diplomatic relations, functioning as a de facto embassy. Its counterpart in Taiwan is the Trade Council of Denmark in Taipei.

History

The first representative office of Taiwan in Denmark was the Free China News Syndicate, established in 1973, which also covered the other Nordic countries. This was succeeded in 1980 by the Free China Information Office, while another body, known as the Far East Trade Office, was established by the Ministry of Economic Affairs. In 1991, the Free China Information Office were merged into the Taipei Economic and Cultural Office in Denmark, which adopted its present name in 1995. Since June 1995, it no longer has responsibility for Norway and the Baltic States, but has remained responsible for Taiwan's relations with Iceland, as well as Greenland and the Faroe Islands.

Representatives

The office is headed by a representative, currently Lee Shying-jow, the former Commanding General of the Republic of China Army.
 Stephan Hsu (1991 - May 1994)
 Chen Yu-chu (May 1994 – November 2000)
 Ku Fu-chang (November 2000 – February 2003)
 Frederic Chang (February 2003 – July 2007)
 Charles Liu (January 2008 – September 2009)
 Clark Chen (September 2009 – August 2012)
 Lily Hsu (August 2012 – January 2016)
 Chuang Heng-sheng (January 2016 – December 2018)
 Lee Shying-jow (December 2018 -)

See also
 Denmark–Taiwan relations
 List of diplomatic missions of Taiwan
 List of diplomatic missions in Denmark

References

External links
 Taipei Economic and Cultural Office in Denmark

 

Taiwan
Denmark
Denmark–Taiwan relations
1980 establishments in Denmark
Diplomatic missions in Copenhagen
Organizations established in 1980